Typhoon Molave, known in the Philippines as Typhoon Quinta, was a strong tropical cyclone that caused widespread damage in the Philippines and Indochina in late October 2020, and became the strongest to strike the South Central Coast of Vietnam since Damrey in 2017. The eighteenth named storm and eighth typhoon of the annual typhoon season, Molave originated from a tropical depression that formed on October 23 east of Palau. At 15:00 UTC the next day, the depression was upgraded into Tropical Storm Molave as it drifted generally northwestward. Molave soon became a typhoon on October 25 as it turned west, shortly before making five landfalls in central Philippines. After striking the Philippines, Molave entered the South China Sea and began to re-intensify. Molave attained its peak intensity on October 27 before weakening again as it approached Vietnam. The typhoon struck Vietnam on October 28, before rapidly weakening as it headed further into Indochina. Molave later dissipated on October 30, over Myanmar.

After carving a path of destruction, 71 people have been confirmed dead and another 46 are missing from Molave. Preliminary damage is estimated at $742 million (2020 USD), though the total damage in Indochina is currently unknown.

Meteorological history

On the same day, PAGASA followed suit as the system formed inside of the Philippine Area of Responsibility, east of Mindanao, and named the system Quinta. On the following day, the Joint Typhoon Warning Center (JTWC) also recognized the system as a tropical depression. At 15:00 UTC of the same day, the JTWC upgraded the system into a tropical storm, with the JMA and PAGASA doing the same a few hours apart from each other. Now a tropical storm, the system was named Molave by the JMA. The next day, PAGASA upgraded the system into a severe tropical storm as it approached Bicol. Later that day, the PAGASA then upgraded Molave into a typhoon as it headed for Albay and Camarines Sur, prompting the raising of TCWS#3 for both and adjacent provinces. Shortly afterwards, the JMA also upgraded the system to a typhoon and the JTWC followed a few hours later. At 18:10 PHT (10:10 UTC), Molave made its first landfall on the San Miguel Island in Albay, with another one in Malinao just 40 minutes later. Molave made three more landfalls in San Andres, Quezon at 22:30 PHT (14:30 UTC), Torrijos, Marinduque at 1:20 PHT October 26 (17:20 UTC), and Pola, Oriental Mindoro at 3:30 PHT (19:30 UTC). Molave emerged over the South China Sea on the same day, continuing to gradually intensify as it left the Philippine Area of Responsibility (PAR) and drifted away from the Philippines. Molave strengthened into a powerful Category 3 typhoon under relatively favorable conditions.

As the system continued westwards, the storm began to slowly weaken as it approached Vietnam. Subsequently, the storm turned slightly to the west-northwest. Molave made landfall on Quảng Ngãi province, central Vietnam at 10:10 UTC+7 (03:10 UTC), October 28 with category 2 typhoon strength. The storm rapidly weakened once inland, with the JTWC issuing their final warning on the system while it still had Typhoon force winds on October 29, as the storm's convection became increasingly disorganized. The JMA continued to track the system as a Tropical Depression over Cambodia until they issued their final advisory on October 30. The storm dissipated shortly afterward, over Myanmar.

Preparations

Philippines
On October 24, 2020, the Philippine Institute of Volcanology and Seismology (PHIVOLCS) warned of lahars down the slopes of Mayon Volcano in Bicol Region during the typhoon.
Nearly 9,000 people were forced to flee their homes in the Philippines, where sea travel was suspended as the storm approached. The opening of the 2020 season of the Philippines Football League (PFL) is postponed to October 28 due to the inclement weather from the typhoon and five players and coaches testing positive for COVID-19 during the ongoing COVID-19 pandemic in the Philippines. Classes and government work were suspended in some areas on October 26, 2020, during the typhoon.

Vietnam
Nearly 1.3 million people are expected to evacuate in Vietnam, as Prime Minister Nguyen Xuan Phuc ordered boats onshore and advised preparations for the security forces and residents in the area. The prime minister also compared Molave to Typhoon Damrey of 2017. Hundreds of flights were canceled and schools were forced to close. The federal government mobilized about 250,000 troops and 2,300 vehicles to be used for search and rescue missions. Members of the Vietnamese military helped load elderly people onto evacuation buses and helped direct boats onshore. Some also helped residents put sandbags on their roof. On October 27, Da Nang People's Committee had requested people to not leave their houses starting from 20:00 UTC+7 (13:00 UTC) that night and urged all officials and workers to not come into work on the next day, among other measures in preparation for the typhoon.

Impact and aftermath

Philippines

The National Disaster Risk Reduction and Management Council (NDRRMC) in the Philippines received reports of damaged roads and bridges, flooding, and landslides that same day. Several villages and farmlands in the region were flooded and power lines and trees were downed, resulting in power outages affecting Albay, Sorsogon, Batangas and Cavite. 120,000 people were displaced and over 1,800 workers were stranded in ports. A state of calamity was declared early on October 27 for the city of Batangas, due to "widespread destruction and substantial damage" caused by the storm.

A yacht off the coast of Batangas Province sank and 7 fishermen were rescued while 12 other fishermen on a boat were reported missing near Catanduanes. Floods caused by Typhoon Saudel in Quezon just a couple of days prior were immediately worsened by Molave. Molave also impacted areas still recovering from the impacts of Typhoon Kammuri (Tisoy) one year earlier, causing residents to flee back to their evacuation centers. Agricultural damage in Bicol reached ₱286 million (US$5.9 million). 6,671 of houses were damaged and 243 of them were totally destroyed by Molave. In Oriental Mindoro, the government estimated the agricultural loss at ₱2 billion (US$41.3 million). The Philippine government organized a disaster relief aid following the typhoon supplying ₱890.5 million worth of food and other items to those affected. The filming of GMA Network's television drama anthology series titled Tadhana in Laiya Beach in Batangas was disrupted by a storm surge.

As of November 9, the NDRRMC reported that 27 people were killed, 40 people were injured and four went missing after the typhoon. Damage from infrastructure and agriculture counted to be ₱1.56 billion (US$32.2 million) and ₱2.66 billion (US$54.9 million) respectively, with a total damage of ₱4.22 billion (US$87.1 million) nationwide.

Vietnam

On October 27, the typhoon caused two Vietnamese fishing boats in the South China Sea to sink. Authorities deployed search boats to search for 26 missing fishermen that were on the boats.

Molave started affecting Vietnam during the evening of October 27. On the morning of October 28, the entire island of Lý Sơn and its 20,000 inhabitants lost electric power. The island was lashed with  winds for hours. Waves as high as  lashed coastal areas of Vietnam. Molave caused widespread destruction in Central Vietnam. Molave brought heavy rains; Sơn Kỳ (Quảng Ngãi) received  over 24 hours of rainfall. Immense rainfall triggered three landslides in Phước Sơn and Nam Trà My districts and buried some villages, with the recovery of at least 21 bodies under rubble. Flooding also isolated 200 workers at the Đăk Mi 2 hydroelectricity plant. The typhoon and following flooding and landslides destroyed or damaged 188,759 houses and infrastructures, flooded 31,928 others and 27,970 hectas of crops.

Molave killed 41 people, injured 143 and 42 others went missing. Economic losses were counted as 13.27 trillion dong (US$572.9 million), including 6.08 trillion dong (US$262.6 million) in Quảng Nam and 5 trillion dong (US$215.7 million) in Quảng Ngãi Province.

Malaysia 
On October 27, the typhoon caused the MV Dayang Topaz to swerve uncontrollably and hit the structure of a drilling platform 14 nautical miles off Miri after one of its anchor cables snapped. A rescue operation was mounted by the Malaysian Maritime Enforcement Agency with the assistance from an oil company in Brunei. Two among the 187 personnel on board were killed.

Thailand 
On November 1, a person was reported dead from the northeastern floods.

Retirement
On November 13, PAGASA announced that the name Quinta would be removed from its list of typhoon names as this typhoon caused almost ₱5-billion in damages and will no longer be used in the future. In January 2021, the PAGASA chose the name Querubin as its replacement for the 2024 season.

In the Spring of 2022, the Typhoon Committee announced that the name Molave, along with four others will be removed from the naming lists. The committee decided Molave would be replaced by Narra.

See also

 Weather of 2020
 Tropical cyclones in 2020
 Other tropical cyclones named Molave
 Other tropical cyclones named Quinta
 Typhoon Hester (1971)
 Typhoon Durian (2006)
 Typhoon Ketsana (2009) – A deadly typhoon that affected similar areas in 2009
 Typhoon Rammasun (2014)
 Typhoon Kammuri (2019) – a powerful typhoon that affected the same areas a year before
 Typhoon Goni (2020) – a powerful typhoon that affected the same areas just a week after Molave

References

External links

 Typhoon Molave – Oct 2020 from ReliefWeb

2020 disasters in Asia
2020 in the Philippines
2020 in Vietnam
Molave
Molave
Molave
2020 disasters in the Philippines
October 2020 events in Asia